Aliabad (also Romanized as ‘Alīābād) is a village in Deh Chal Rural District, in the Central District of Khondab County, Markazi Province, Iran. At the 2006 census, its population was 943, in 234 families.

References 

Populated places in Khondab County